Fidelis Mhashu (died 20 August 2018) was a Zimbabwean politician who served as Minister of National Housing and Social Amenities from 2009 to 2013. He served as the Member of Parliament (MP) for Chitungwiza North (MDC-T) until his death.

References

1940s births
2018 deaths
Members of the National Assembly of Zimbabwe
Date of birth missing
Government ministers of Zimbabwe
People from Chitungwiza